Baldrine Station (Manx: Stashoon Raad Yiarn Valley Drine) is a railway halt in the Isle of Man. It is an intermediate request stop on the east coast route of the Manx Electric Railway in the village of Baldrine in the parish of Lonan, on the route to Ramsey.

Location
This halt can be found between Onchan and Laxey. It lies behind the local chapel and serves the small village of the same name.  Nearby is the local Methodist Chapel and meeting room, the tramway passes to the rear of this building.

Facilities
The halt has a small corrugated iron shelter in typical Manx Electric Railway style which is regularly tended by locals who provide flower displays and keep the area smart.  The station is on the main coast road between Douglas and Ramsey.  To the north side of the station there is also a minor road.  The site is a typical rural railway scene, unchanged for many years.

Sponsorship
The station is tended to by a local group from the Women's Institute who look after the general cleanliness of the station and add flower beds and baskets to the station in the summer months.

Route

Also
Manx Electric Railway Stations

References

Sources

 Manx Electric Railway Stopping Places (2002) Manx Electric Railway Society
 Island Images: Manx Electric Railway Pages (2003) Jon Wornham
 Official Tourist Department Page (2009) Isle Of Man Heritage Railways

Railway stations opened in 1899
Railway stations in the Isle of Man
Manx Electric Railway
1899 establishments in the Isle of Man